"Shine More" (styled in lowercase letters) is Namie Amuro's 22nd solo single under the Avex Trax label.

Track listing 
 "Shine More" (Paul Taylor, Scott Nickoley, Sandra Pires, H.U.B) – 3:40
 "Drive" (Cherokee, Brion James, Anthony Nance, Namie Amuro) – 4:24
 "Shine More (Instrumental)" (Paul Taylor, Scott Nickoley, Sandra Pires) – 3:40
 "Drive (Instrumental)" (Cherokee, Brion James, Anthony Nance) – 4:21

Digital download 
 "Shine More" (Paul Taylor, Scott Nickoley, Sandra Pires, H.U.B) – 3:40
 "Drive" (Cherokee, Brion James, Anthony Nance, Namie Amuro) – 4:24

Personnel 
Namie Amuro – vocals, background vocals

Production 
Mixing – David Z.
Mixing assistant – Sang Park
Instrument programming – David L. Huff, Cobra Endo
Vocal direction – Mayumi Harada
Music video director – Ugichin
Choreographer – Warner

TV performances 
March 1, 2003 – PopJam
March 1, 2003 – CDTV
March 6, 2003 – AX Music Factory
March 7, 2003 – Music Station
March 10, 2003 – Hey! Hey! Hey! Music Champ
April 2, 2003 – CDTV Special
January 1, 2004 – CDTV Special Live 2003-2004

Charts 
Oricon Sales Chart (Japan)

RIAJ certification 
"Shine More" has been certified gold for shipments of over 100,000 by the Recording Industry Association of Japan.

Trivia
 This song was resung by Sandra Pires and used in episode 2x12 of Veronica Mars.

References 
 

2003 singles
Namie Amuro songs
Avex Trax singles
2003 songs